Malaya Povalikha is a rural locality (a selo) in Novoberezovsky Selsoviet, Pervomaysky District, Altai Krai, Russia. The population was 68 as of 2013. There are 2 streets.

Geography 
Malaya Povalikha is located 76 km northeast of Novoaltaysk (the district's administrative centre) by road. Novoberyozovka is the nearest rural locality.

References 

Rural localities in Pervomaysky District, Altai Krai